Wenn du gehst is the ninth German single recorded by U. S. entertainer Connie Francis. The B-side was Gondola d'Amore.

Both songs had been written especially in German for Francis since after her previous eight German singles it had become clear that compositions of German origin were favored by the German audiences instead of cover versions of Francis' U. S. hits.

"Gondola d'Amore" was subsequently recorded by Francis in French as Toutes les étoiles.

References

1962 singles
Connie Francis songs
1962 songs
MGM Records singles
Songs written by Werner Scharfenberger
Songs written by Fini Busch